Maverick Mountain is a census-designated place (CDP) in Beaverhead County, Montana, United States, consisting of residences in the valley of Grasshopper Creek at the base of Maverick Mountain Ski Area. The scenic byway continues north  to the town of Wise River in the Big Hole River valley.

Maverick Mountain was first listed as a CDP prior to the 2020 census.

Demographics

References 

Census-designated places in Beaverhead County, Montana
Census-designated places in Montana